Charles Reed (1814–59), later known as Charles Verelst, was an English architect who practised in Birkenhead, which was then in Cheshire and later in Merseyside.  Most of his works are in the locality of his office, but he also designed buildings in North Wales, Lancashire and Cumbria.  Reed's listed buildings are mainly large houses, but he also designed churches and a market hall.

Confirmed works

Attributed works

References
Citations

Sources

Reed, Charles